Make-up Designory (MUD) is a private, for-profit trade school focused on make-up with locations in Burbank, California and New York City. It was founded in 1997.

MUD Cosmetics 
MUD Cosmetics is a cosmetic brand created by Make-up Designory.

MUD Partner Schools 
MUD Partner Schools were developed to introduce makeup artistry into cosmetologist and esthetician educations. They are located in many U.S. states as well as the United Arab Emirates, India, and Portugal.

References

External links
 Official website

Education in Los Angeles
Educational institutions established in 1997
1997 establishments in California